Sudanese Democratic Party (in ) was a short-lived political outfit in French Soudan. PDS was formed in 1945 by two French Communist Party. PDS launched Modibo Keita as their candidate in the 1945 elections to the Constituent Assembly of the Fourth Republic.

Source: Imperato, Pascal James. Mali: A Search for Direction. Boulder: Westview Press, 1989.

1945 establishments in French Sudan
Communist parties in Mali
Defunct political parties in Mali
Political parties established in 1945